Portofino is a comune located in the Metropolitan City of Genoa on the Italian Riviera. The town is clustered around its small harbour, and is known for the colourfully painted buildings that line the shore. Since the late 19th century Portofino has attracted tourism of the European aristocracy and it is now a resort for the world's jet set.

History

The village is mentioned in a diploma from 986 by Adelaide of Italy, which assigned it to the nearby Abbey of San Fruttuoso di Capodimonte. In 1171, together with the neighbouring Santa Margherita Ligure, it was included in Rapallo's commune jurisdiction. After 1229 it was part of the Republic of Genoa. The town's natural harbour supported a fleet of fishing boats, but was somewhat too cramped to provide more than a temporary safe haven for the growing merchant marine of the Republic of Genoa.

In 1409 Portofino was sold to the Republic of Florence by Charles VI of France, during the period that he was also lord of the Genoese Republic, but when the latter was ousted from Genoa the Florentines gave it back. In the 15th century it was a fief of families such as the Fieschi, Spinola, Adorno, and Doria.

In 1815 it became part of the Kingdom of Sardinia and, from 1861, of the unified Kingdom of Italy.

In the late 19th century, first British, then other Northern European aristocratic tourists began to visit Portofino, which they reached by horse and cart from Santa Margherita Ligure. Aubrey Herbert and Elizabeth von Arnim were among the more famous English people to make the area fashionable. Eventually, more expatriates built expensive holiday houses, and by 1950 tourism had replaced fishing as the town's chief industry, and the waterfront was a continuous ring of restaurants and cafés.

Main sights
This statue was placed to protect fishermen and scuba divers and in memory of Dario Gonzatti, the first Italian to use SCUBA gear, who died in 1947. Sculpted by Guido Galletti, it represents Christ in the act of blessing while looking up towards the sky with open arms in a sign of peace.
 Castello Brown (16th century).
 Church of St. Martin (Divo Martino, 12th century).
 Church of St. George, housing some saints' relics.
 Oratory of Santa Maria Assunta, in Gothic style.

In popular culture
 The Enchanted April, a 1922 best-selling novel by Elizabeth von Arnim based on the author's stay in Castello Brown, is credited with making Portofino fashionable. The novel was the basis of a 1991 feature filmed in the Castello, with a cast including Joan Plowright, Miranda Richardson and Alfred Molina. The film was nominated for three Oscars.
Portofino was visited by Finland Swedish writer Göran Schildt and his ketch Daphne in 1948 on the start of his travels on the Mediterranean Sea.
Portofino is often thought to be the inspiration for Sir Clough Williams-Ellis' Italianate village named Portmeirion, built between 1925 and 1975, in north Wales. However, this was repeatedly denied by the architect. He stated only that he wanted to pay tribute to the atmosphere of the Mediterranean. He did, however, draw on a love of the Italian village, stating "How should I not have fallen for Portofino? Indeed its image remained with me as an almost perfect example of the man-made adornment and use of an exquisite site."
In 1959 Dalida released song "Love in Portofino", written by Leo Chiosso and composed by Fred Buscaglione. With lyrics in French and Italian language, it became a hit and was later iconised alongside the village's name. It also spawned several international covers, including Andrea Bocelli's in 2013 which was followed by a concert recorded and issued on DVD.
Portofino is the eponym of Frank Schaeffer's Portofino: A Novel (1992). It was the first of Schaeffer's Calvin Becker Trilogy.

Portofino is one of the shooting locations of the 1995 Antonioni/Wenders film, Beyond the Clouds.
There is a full-scale replica, in authentic detail, of Portofino Bay at Universal Orlando Resort in Orlando, USA, which opened in September 1999.
Portofino inspired in 2001 a recreation of the seaside town in the Mediterranean Harbor area at Tokyo DisneySea in Chiba, Japan. It also served as the namesake for the restaurant Cafe Portofino.
Portofino was featured in 2008 in the BBC television series Top Gear. Richard Hammond, in a Ferrari Daytona raced James May in a carbon fibre powerboat from Portofino to St Tropez in France.
Ferrari named one of their sports cars the Ferrari Portofino in 2017. In 2018 the Scuderia Ferrari Club Portofino was founded.
In the 2021 Disney-Pixar animated film Luca, the fictional town of Portorosso is based on Portofino, as well as other villages in the Italian Riviera.
The 2022 six-episode period drama television series Hotel Portofino, set in the 1920s, was created by Matt Baker in 2020, filmed principally on location in Portofino in 2021, and is being shown on Britbox, PBS, and other television networks. The show was renewed for a second season.

Notable residents 

 King Richard I of England (1157-1199), in 1190
 Pope Gregory XI (1330-1378), in 1377
 Henry Herbert (1831-1890), British Politician
 Guy de Maupassant (1850-1893), French writer
 Guglielmo Marconi (1874-1937), Italian engineer, inventor of radio
 Giuseppe Amisani (1879-1941), Italian painter
 Michele Cascella (1892-1989), Italian painter
 Rex Harrison (1908-1990), English actor
 Lilli Palmer (1914-1986), German actress, wife of Rex Harrison

Twin towns
 Kinsale, Republic of Ireland
 Palma, Spain
 Cassis, France
 Belvedere, California, United States

See also 
 Italian Riviera
 List of castles in Italy
 Castello Brown
 Cervara Abbey
 Paraggi

References

External links

 
Portofino
Portofino Travel Guide
Portofino tourism
City Hall
Portofino Natural Park

Italian Riviera
Fishing communities